Danell is both a surname and a given name. Notable people with the name include:

Dennis Danell (1961–2000), American musician
James Danell (1821–1881), English Roman Catholic bishop
Sven Danell (1903–1981), Swedish Lutheran bishop
Danell Leyva (born 1991), American gymnast
Danell Lynn, American long-distance motorcycle rider
Danell Nicholson (born 1967), American boxer